Ryshpan is a surname. Notable people with the surname include:

 Arden R. Ryshpan, Canadian casting director and actress
 Howard Ryshpan (born 1932), English-speaking Canadian actor in radio, film, television, and theater